Psaltoda harrisii, commonly known as the yellowbelly, is a species of cicada native to eastern Australia. It can be distinguished from the similar but larger Black prince (Psaltoda plaga), by noting the absence of a dark Z-shaped infuscation near the apex of the forewings, which is present on P. plaga.

References

External links

Hemiptera of Australia
Insects described in 1814
Psaltodini